Nogometni klub IB 1975 Ljubljana or simply NK IB 1975 Ljubljana is a Slovenian football club which plays in the city of Ljubljana. They won the Slovenian Cup twice and the Slovenian Supercup once.

History
The club was founded in 1975 as NK Ježica. In the next two decades they competed mostly in the Ljubljana League, which was the fifth or sixth level of Yugoslav football. After the independence of Slovenia the league was transformed into the intercommunal MNZ League, and the club was renamed to NK Factor Ježica. They merged with nearby Črnuče in 1997 and therefore played in Slovenian Second League until 1999. Factor was then relegated to third level, where they stayed until 2004, when they won the centre zone and defeated Korte in promotion play-off. After returning to the second division, the club had to move their home matches to ŽŠD Ljubljana Stadium due to insufficient criteria of their home field.

Factor earned promotion to the Slovenian PrvaLiga in 2006, finishing first in the Slovenian Second League in the 2005–06 season. In 2007, Joc Pečečnik, one of the richest persons in Slovenia, took over NK Factor and renamed them to Interblock Ljubljana. At the end of the 2006–07 season, Interblock came ninth and won a play-off series to remain in the Slovenian PrvaLiga, the first division of Slovenian professional football. In the 2007–08 and 2008–09 seasons, they won the Slovenian Cup. In 2008, they won the Slovenian Supercup, defeating the Slovenian champions Domžale.

In 2010, the club started to cooperate with NK Bravo and the team was renamed to IB Interblock. In the next year, the senior squads of both teams merged and they competed as Bravo1 Interblock in the Second League. In February 2012, Pečečnik, who has left the club after the 2011–12 season, intended to merge their youth selections with NK Bravo Publikum, but after the revolt from parents of the youth selections, the club has remained its own entity. The senior team withdrew from all competitions in 2012 but was reestablished in the 2015–16 season.

Honours
League
Slovenian Second League
 Winners (1): 2005–06
Runners-up (1): 2010–11
Slovenian Third League
 Winners (1): 2003–04
Runners-up (2): 2000–01, 2002–03
MNZ League (fifth tier) Winners (1): 2015–16CupSlovenian Cup Winners (2): 2007–08, 2008–09Slovenian Supercup Winners (1): 2008
Runners-up (1): 2009

European record

Key1Q: First qualifying round2Q: Second qualifying round3Q''': Third qualifying round

References

External links
Official website 

 
Association football clubs established in 1975
1975 establishments in Slovenia
Football clubs in Slovenia
Football clubs in Ljubljana